Umm-e-Haniya is a 2018 Pakistani drama serial. It was directed by Tahseen Khan, produced by Babar Javed and written by Kishore Asmal The drama stars Neelam Muneer and Waseem Tirmazi, and first aired on 24 January 2018 on Geo Entertainment. The story revolves around the life of a passionate young woman Romi who faces complications after saving a life of a baby that she found in park.

Plot
The film tells the story of Roomi, a passionate and kind hearted girl who wants to be a cricketer. Despite her family's disinclination she goes for practice to appear in cricket board test with the help of her club manager Rohan. She passed the test and travels to Islamabad for her training by the cricket board members. Towards the end of her training week she is pushed by a rival teammate. Her injuries put her on bed rest and she returns to Karachi.

Rohan, Roomi's manager is in love with middle class girl Saba whom his mother Zeenat and sister Maham didn't like. Rohan married her against his mother's wishes. Maham got divorced because her sister in law had to marry Rohan. Zeenat didn't allow Rohan and Saba to live in her house, so they left for America. Saba was also pregnant. On their way to the airport, their vehicle was hit by Kamil, who was Roomi's fiancé. Saba died there, but she gave birth to a girl while Rohan carried her to hospital. To avenge Saba Zeenat secretly puts the baby in public park, telling Rohan that his wife and child both had died. Rohan filed FIR against the deadly vehicle. After this accident heartbroken Rohan goes to America.

Roomi spends most of her time on the playground where she initially practiced. One day she finds the newborn abandoned by Zeenat. She surprises her family saying that she wants to raise her as one of their own. She named her Haniya. Roomi faces serious accusations for keeping this child from her bhabhi and in-laws, but sticks to her decision until her fiancé Kamil drops the engagement. Her father agrees to take responsibility for the child, Roomi marries the love of her life. Shagufta (Kamil's mother) is a greedy and traditional woman who does not like Roomi as her bahu.

As the story progressed, Roomi manages to adjust in her married life. She struggles to bring Haniya to her in-laws place, leaving her dreams behind. Shagufta opposes Roomi and is against bringing Haniya to her house, but with the support of the rest of the households, Roomi prevails. Shagufta hatches plots against her bahu, but Roomi stands strong against her evil. Roomi is approached by the media for her act of kindness but Shagufta verbally attacks Roomi. When Roomi's family sees the news, Roomi's father cannot endure the stains on his family's honor and dies of a heart attack. Shagufta arranges her second son Anjum's marriage with his love Maham, who is Rohan's sister. Roomi had a good understanding with his brother-in-law Anjum and sister-in-law Zoya. Zoya is in love with Mohsin. She wants Roomi to tell Kamil about Zoya and Mohsin. Roomi decides to help Zoya. Roomi tries to tell the family about Mohsin, but is interrupted by Shagufta. She always sends her son Kamil against Roomi and Haniya, which weakens the relationship of Kamil and Haniya. Soon Kamil learns through Room I medical reports that she can never be a mother.

Anjum's family starts to arrange Anjum's marriage. During the marriage ceremony Roomi falls on stage because of weakness, but Shagufta imagines that Roomi is expecting a baby. When Shagufta realises that incident happens due to Roomi's weakness, she attacks Roomi for being childless and taking care of Haniya. Shagufta strictly advises Maham to stay away from Roomi and Haniya.

Right after marriage, Zeenat meets her daughter where she notices Shagufta poor behaviour with Roomi. She advises Maham to beware of her mother in law. Later on Zoya's phone is found by Kamil in Roomi's cupboard, ringing with a call from Mohsin. Kamil misunderstands Mohsin as Roomi's boyfriend and bashes upon him. Kamil also reveals the truth to his family about Roomi pregnancy. Shagufta forces Kamil to divorce Roomi, but soon Zoya exposes herself and asks forgiveness. Kamil is ashamed of his behaviour with Roomi. He asks forgiveness and accepts in front of the family that Roomi was never wrong, it was her mother Shagufta who misguided everyone about Roomi. He promises to never break her trust. Kamil threatens her mother that if she said something to Roomi than he will leave the house.

Abruptly Zeenat's kidney starts hurting, bringing Rohan back from America. He learns from the police that the person who caused the accident was Kamil. Rohan in anger went to Kamil and reveal in front of the whole family that because of his mistake his wife Saba died. Because of strong relations between two families, Rohan forgives Kamil. Kamil is ashamed in front of his family and next day he goes to the police station, but is restricted by his family. Maham exposes to Rohan that her baby lived, but his mother left her in the park because of jealousy of Saba. Rohan criticized his mother and started seeking her daughter. He learns that Haniya is his daughter. Roomi does not want to hand over Haniya to Rohan because she has raised her and loves her. Rohan forcefully takes the baby. Kamil can't bear to see Roomi in pain. He decides to bring Haniya back to Roomi. Later on Rohan sacrifices by giving his baby to Roomi. Rohan donates a kidney to Zeenat. Serial ends with Haniya grown up playing cricket with her parents, Roomi and Kamil.

Cast

Roomi's Family
Neelam Muneer as Roomi (Rumaissa)
Hashim Butt as Rehman
Rabia Noreen as Naila
Imran Patel as Asad
Sofia Khan as Sundus

Kamil's Family
Waseem Tirmazi as Kamil
Shan Baig as Anjum
Fauzia Mushtaq as Shagufta

Rohan's Family
Danial Afzal Khan as Rohan
Farah Shah as Zeenat
Yashma Gill as Saba
Qurat Ul Ain as Maham

Other
Memoona Mughal as Shazia

Broadcast and release
The serial first aired on 24 January 2018 with a one-hour episode on Geo Entertainment. It was interrupted for one month during Ramadan, after which its timing was reduced to half-hour evening episodes from Monday to Friday at 7:00 P.M.

Digital release
The series is available for streaming on Zee5 app since 27 May 2021.

External links
 Umm-e-Haniya - IMDb

References

Geo TV original programming
Pakistani drama television series
Urdu-language television shows
2018 Pakistani television series debuts